The 2006 NBL season was the 25th season of the National Basketball League. The Hawke's Bay Hawks won the championship in 2006 to claim their first league title.

Summary

Regular season standings

Playoff bracket

Awards

Player of the Week

Statistics leaders
Stats as of the end of the regular season

Regular season
 Most Valuable Player: Paora Winitana (Hawke's Bay Hawks)
 NZ Most Valuable Player: Casey Frank (Auckland Stars)
 Most Outstanding Guard: Paora Winitana (Hawke's Bay Hawks)
 Most Outstanding NZ Guard: Paora Winitana (Hawke's Bay Hawks)
 Most Outstanding Forward: Casey Frank (Auckland Stars)
 Most Outstanding NZ Forward/Centre: Casey Frank (Auckland Stars)
 Scoring Champion: Dennis Trammell (Canterbury Rams)
 Rebounding Champion: Miles Pearce (Otago Nuggets)
 Assist Champion: Brad Davidson (Manawatu Jets)
 Rookie of the Year: Shaun Tilby (Otago Nuggets)
 Coach of the Year: Nenad Vučinić (Nelson Giants)
 All-Star Five:
 G: Lindsay Tait (Auckland Stars)
 G: Paora Winitana (Hawke's Bay Hawks)
 F: Josh Pace (Nelson Giants)
 F: Casey Frank (Auckland Stars)
 C: Nick Horvath (Wellington Saints)

Playoffs
 Final MVP: Paora Winitana (Hawke's Bay Hawks)

References

External links
Basketball New Zealand 2006 Results Annual
2006 season links
2006 season preview

National Basketball League (New Zealand) seasons
NBL